This is a list of the mammal species recorded in Tuvalu. There are three mammal species in Tuvalu identified in the IUCN Red List, all of which are marine mammals of the order Cetacea: ginkgo-toothed beaked whale (Mesoplodon ginkgodens), pygmy killer whale (Feresa attenuata), and pantropical spotted dolphin (Stenella attenuata).

The literature review by Miller (2006) found four additional cetaceans reported: orca or killer whale (Orcinus orca), spinner dolphin (Stenella longirostris), bottlenose dolphin (Tursiops truncatus), and sperm whale (Physeter macrocephalus). The pantropical spotted dolphin (Stenella attenuata) is found in the lists of both Miller and the IUCN.

A revision of the list of cetaceans reported in the ocean surrounding Tuvalu was carried out by Miller (2009), who listed a "minke-like" whale (Balaenoptera species) and a diminutive sperm whale (Kogia species).

In 2010 a research voyage was conducted within the exclusive economic zones (EEZs) of Kiribati and Tuvalu. The survey confirmed the presence of seven species of cetaceans: sperm whale, killer whale, Bryde's whale (Balaenoptera brydei), short-finned pilot whale (Globicephala macrorhynchus), false killer whale (Pseudorca crassidens), spinner dolphin, and striped dolphin (Stenella coeruleoalba).

The Pacific Ocean surrounding Tuvalu is within the range of these cetaceans although sightings of some of these species may be infrequent.

The following tags are used to highlight each species' conservation status as assessed by the International Union for Conservation of Nature:

Order: Cetacea (whales) 

The order Cetacea includes whales, dolphins and porpoises. They are the mammals most fully adapted to aquatic life with a spindle-shaped nearly hairless body, protected by a thick layer of blubber, and forelimbs and tail modified to provide propulsion underwater.

 Parvorder Mysticeti: baleen whales
  Superfamily Balaenopteroidea
 Family Balaenopteridae: rorquals
 Subfamily Balaenopterinae
 Genus Balaenoptera: slender rorquals
 Bryde's whale, Balaenoptera brydei DD
 Parvorder Odontoceti: toothed whales
 Superfamily Delphinoidea: dolphins and relatives
 Family Delphinidae: oceanic dolphins
 Subfamily Delphininae
 Genus Stenella
 Pantropical spotted dolphin, Stenella attenuata LR/cd
 Spinner dolphin, Stenella longirostris LR/cd
 Striped dolphin, Stenella coeruleoalba LC
 Genus Tursiops
 Common bottlenose dolphin, Tursiops truncatus DD
 Subfamily Orcininae
 Genus Feresa
 Pygmy killer whale, Feresa attenuata DD
 Genus Globicephala
 Short-finned pilot whale, Globicephala macrorhyncus LR/cd
 Genus Orcinus
 Killer whale (orca), Orcinus orca DD
Genus: Pseudorca
 False killer whale, Pseudorca crassidens DD
 Superfamily Physeteroidea, sperm whales
 Family Kogiidae
 Genus Kogia
 Dwarf sperm whale, Kogia sima LR/lc
 Family Physeteridae: sperm whale family
 Genus Physeter
 Sperm whale, Physeter macrocephalus  VU
Superfamily Ziphioidea, beaked whales
 Family Ziphidae, beaked whales
 Subfamily Hyperoodontinae
 Genus Mesoplodon, mesoplodont whales
 Ginkgo-toothed beaked whale, Mesoplodon ginkgodens DD

See also

List of chordate orders
Lists of mammals by region
List of prehistoric mammals
Mammal classification
List of mammals described in the 2000s

Notes

References
 
 

 Edgar Waite published an account of The Mammals, Reptiles, and Fishes of Funafuti (Australian Museum, Sydney, 1897).

Tuvalu
Mammals
Fauna of Tuvalu
Tuvalu